Britain's Best Dish is a British daytime cookery show part of the ITV Food category on ITV and hosted by Mary Nightingale. Amateur cooks from around the UK compete to cook "Britain's Best Dish" and a prize of £10,000. The judges were Ed Baines, John Burton Race and Jilly Goolden. From October 2011, the competition was rebranded as simply Best Dish with new graphics and a new look studio.

The programme aired weekdays at 5pm from 2007 until 2011. A book containing recipes from the series was published in 2009.

Format
In the regional heats, Monday to Thursday, three pairs of amateur cooks compete every day to produce the best starter, main and pudding with three winners from each course going through to a regional final on Friday. The judges choose the winners each day and also select the finalists to enter the regional final. In later rounds, heats select the best of the regional winners with a guest panel of critics taking on the task of choosing the winning dishes. The contestants are refined down to compete for Britain's best starter, main course and pudding. Of these, viewers then vote to decide the overall winner of the title "Britain's Best Dish" in the series final.

Judging
The judges watch the contestants at work via a videolink and offer their comments on the preparations.  The judges now taste the dishes in the presence of the cooks and offer them their comments whereas in earlier series, they tasted the dishes and conferred without the contestants in the studio.

Host
The original host was ex-cricketer and sports presenter Mark Nicholas for series 1 to 4. Mary Nightingale took over as presenter for series 5 & 6 with the show getting a makeover with shortened opening credits and a refreshed theme tune but staying true to the main format.

Best Dish: The Chefs
In October 2011, the series returned as Best Dish: The Chefs with a new logo and slicker look with professional chefs competing instead of amateurs.  It still concentrates on recipes from around the regions of the UK with short clips showing the restaurants where the competitors work as professional chefs.

Sponsors
The show has been sponsored by the New Covent Garden Soup Company, Uncle Ben's sauces and Red Tractor mark meats.  Best Dish is now sponsored by Tesco Finest Range.

Former features
The original series was broadcast in the autumn but from series 5, the programme was scheduled to run in the spring.

Auditions
From series 1 to 4, the show contained elements of "reality TV" with clips from regional auditions held around the UK making up a major element of the programme. The judges would taste dishes offered by members of the public attending the regional auditions. They would accept or reject the contestants at these food "auditions". The auditions were filmed in locations from around the UK with regional identities colouring the flavour of these early heats. This "reality show" feature was reduced in series 4 and by series 5 the early rounds of regional "auditions" were dropped from the series altogether and conducted off-air. There was also little mention of regional identities and the clips from the auditions were no longer shown on the programme. By series 6, the main action was concentrated in the kitchen in the studio with the relaunch as Best Dish.

Transmissions

Regular

Celebrity

International broadcasts
In Australia, Britain's Best Dish began airing as 'Best Dish' on the Seven Network's free-to-air digital channel 7Two at 8.30pm Friday nights in 2009 but as of 12 September 2010 is airing at 5pm weekdays under its full title.

External links

2007 British television series debuts
2011 British television series endings
English-language television shows
ITV game shows
Television series by ITV Studios